Alva Theodore Bonda (1917 - October 22, 2005) was the president of the Cleveland Indians from 1973 to 1978. He was born in Cleveland, Ohio, which also served as his death place. He was a partner in Nick Mileti's ownership group who assumed control of the team in 1973, though Mileti wasn't completely bought out until 1975.  While with the Indians in 1974 he hired Frank Robinson to be the first African-American baseball manager.

Bonda was a partner with Howard Metzenbaum in Metzenbaum's airport parking company. The two were also principal owners of the Cleveland Stokers professional soccer club and in the Indians. He was named after Alva Bradley, a previous Indians owner who owned the building where Bonda's father worked. Bonda was active in civic affairs, particularly the Cleveland School Board.

Political Views 

Bonda was a liberal Democrat. He dedicated a lot of his wealth to philanthropic endeavors.

References

Major League Baseball executives
Cleveland Indians executives
1917 births
2005 deaths
American sports businesspeople
Businesspeople from Cleveland
Jewish American baseball people
Major League Baseball team presidents
North American Soccer League (1968–1984) executives
20th-century American businesspeople
20th-century American Jews
21st-century American Jews